Wheelset may refer to: 
 a pair of bicycle wheels
 wheelset (rail transport), a pair of railroad vehicle wheels mounted rigidly on an axle